Søren Frederiksen (born 7 August 1989) is a Danish former professional footballer who played as a winger.

Career
Frederiksen played in SønderjyskE from 2006 to 2010. After his big breakthrough in the 2009–10 Danish Superliga, a transfer to F.C. Copenhagen on 1 July 2010 was announced, but he was supposed to continue in SønderjyskE for the 2010–11 season. Although, as Morten Nordstrand turned out to be injured for all 2010, F.C. Copenhagen and SønderjyskE agreed on 1 September 2010 to transfer Frederiksen immediately. He scored his first goal for Copenhagen in a Danish Cup game against Viby IF.

Later career
Frederiksen joined SønderjyskE in July 2017. Suffering with a knee injury for a long period, Frederiksen announced on 24 February 2020 that he would retire immediately and continue in a scout, analytic and coach/leader position at SønderjyskE. 

In the summer of 2022, he joined Brøndby IF in a similar role.

Honours

Club
FC Copenhagen
Danish Superliga: 2010–11

AaB
Danish Superliga: 2013–14
Danish Cup: 2013–14

SønderjyskE
Danish Cup: 2019–20

References

 Frederiksen skifter til Viborg FF, Viborg FF, 28 January 2016

External links
 
 Danish national team profile

1989 births
Living people
Danish men's footballers
Danish expatriate men's footballers
People from Sønderborg Municipality
FC Sønderborg players
SønderjyskE Fodbold players
F.C. Copenhagen players
AaB Fodbold players
Vejle Boldklub Kolding players
Knattspyrnufélag Reykjavíkur players
Viborg FF players
Danish Superliga players
Association football midfielders
Association football forwards
Danish expatriate sportspeople in Iceland
Expatriate footballers in Iceland
Sportspeople from the Region of Southern Denmark